Lena Ruth Stefanovic (born 4 June 1970) is a Montenegrin author and poet.

References

Montenegrin poets
Living people
1970 births
Place of birth missing (living people)